The System is a 1953 American film noir crime film directed by Lewis Seiler and starring Frank Lovejoy, Joan Weldon and Robert Arthur.

Plot
An honest bookmaker discovers the hard way that his line of work is a lot more dangerous than he first thought.

Cast
 Frank Lovejoy as John E. "Johnny" Merrick
 Joan Weldon as Felice Stuart
 Robert Arthur as Rex Merrick
 Paul Picerni as David Wiley
 Don Beddoe as Jerry Allen
 Jerome Cowan as Barry X. Brady
 Dan Seymour as Mr. Marty
 Sarah Selby as Mrs. Elizabeth Allen
 Fay Roope as Roger Stuart
 Frank Richards as Charley, Merrick's Butler
 Vic Perrin as Little Harry Goubenek
 Henry Corden as Specs alias Morton Kovick
 Howard Negley as Senator Richard Ketteridge
 Alan Gordon as Big Reuben 
 Bruno VeSota as Angelo Bruno

Reception
When the film was first released, The New York Times''' review was brutal.  The film critic wrote, "It seems quite appropriate for Warner Brothers' The System, a stultified excursion into contemporary crime, to have opened at the Palace yesterday. The morning weather was drab and depressing. So was the picture ... The sad fact to be faced is that there is not a single thing to recommend The System. The performance of the feminine lead, Joan Weldon, is embarrassing in its inadequacy. Mr. Lovejoy makes an honest effort in a professional way, but the script is such a peachy morass he has no chance. That Lewis Seiler, the director, should fail so is more disappointing when one recalls his memorable Guadalcanal Diary''." Forget this fiasco, for it is one of those soggy melodramas that serve only to fill out double bills."

References

External links
 
 
 
 
 The System information site and DVD review at DVD Beaver (includes images)
 

1953 films
1950s crime thriller films
American crime thriller films
American black-and-white films
Film noir
Films about organized crime in the United States
Films scored by David Buttolph
Warner Bros. films
1950s English-language films
1950s American films